Kathryn M. Haigh (born December 3, 1950) is an American veterinarian and Democratic Party member of the Washington House of Representatives, representing the 35th district.

References

1950 births
Living people
Democratic Party members of the Washington House of Representatives
Women state legislators in Washington (state)
21st-century American women